Pasquale La Ragione (born 28 November 1943) is a retired Italian fencer. He competed in the individual and team foil events at the 1964 and 1968 Summer Olympics and finished in seventh place with the Italian team at both Games.

References

External links
 

1943 births
Living people
Italian male foil fencers
Olympic fencers of Italy
Fencers at the 1964 Summer Olympics
Fencers at the 1968 Summer Olympics